Filippo Ghioldi (born 6 January 1999) is an Italian professional footballer who plays as a midfielder for  club Pro Patria.

Club career
A product of Pro Patria’s youth system, Ferri was promoted to the first team in 2017. He was part of the team who won the 2017–18 Serie D.

Honours
Pro Patria
 Serie D: 2017–18

References

External links
 
 

1999 births
Living people
Sportspeople from the Province of Como
Footballers from Lombardy
Italian footballers
Association football midfielders
Serie C players
Aurora Pro Patria 1919 players